Popstars is a German reality television series that began its first installment on the RTL II network on 14 November 2000. Part of the international Popstars franchise, it originated from the New Zealand reality programme of the same name.

The show accompanies the making of pop group whose members depend on the particular season's concept. In its 11 seasons, it spawned musical acts No Angels, Bro'Sis, Overground, Preluders, Nu Pagadi, Monrose, Room 2012, Queensberry, Some & Any, LaViVe, Melouria, and Leandah.

Overview 
The series follows a group of aspiring singers aged 16 or older as they go through an audition process to join a pop group. The contestants, who also live together during the course of the series, are judged on their vocal and dancing ability. Outside of stage performances, the contestants experience choreography and song recording.

First-season winners No Angels (Sandy Mölling, Lucy Diakovska, Nadja Benaissa, Jessica Wahls and Vanessa Petruo) were set to be the new Spice Girls.

Second-season winners Bro'Sis (Hila Bronstein, Faiz Mangat, Ross Antony, Shaham Joyce, Giovanni Zarrella and Indira Weis) were meant to be more edgy than their predecessors. That season both sexes were allowed to participate in the competition.

Third-season winners Overground (Ahmet "Akay" Kayed, Ken Miyao, Marq Porciuncula and Meiko Reißmann) won over girl group Preluders that season after a boys vs. girls battle depending on record sales and telephone votes during a big live finale.

Fourth-season winners Nu Pagadi (Markus Grimm, Patrick Boinet, Kristina Dörfer and Doreen Steinert) were titled as the best group created by this format by the judges when they had been in the pre-making statues. However, they landed some hits, but disbanded shortly after the show due to arguments between the group members. Presented as being the last group to be created by this format, they were pushed in a glam rock–rock direction in a very early statues of the show.

Fifth-season winners Monrose (Senna Gammour, Bahar Kızıl and Mandy Capristo) were created with the aim to find the new angels in addition to No Angels and to find the best voices. Consisting of only three members they were very edgy with no blond girl inside and their very strong but different characters. And maybe because of their edginess they should be along with the No Angles the most successful band to be created by this show.

Sixth-season winners Room 2012 (Cristobal Galvez Moreno, Sascha Schmitz, Julian Kasprzik and Tialda van Slogteren) were set to be the hottest live act in Germany. The group went on a tour directly after the show. This time the colour of  the voice was less important than the ability to sing live in concert and get the keys. Dancers were also cast to support the final group in making a good live-show.

Seventh-season winners Queensberry (Leonore Bartsch, Victoria Ulbrich, Gabriella De Almeida Rinne and Antonella Trapani) were created with the aim to find Germany's next girl group consisting of four members. in contrast to season 5, the performance played an important rule again.

An eight season was planned for 2009 under the motto "Duo". The live semi-final on 8 December consisted of three duos. One was set to be eliminated, but the host announced that the audience could vote for their favorite duo until the final. The audience responded with heavy boos. The Final on 10 December was won by 18-year-old Vanessa Meisinger and the Brazilian-Swiss 20-year-old Leonardo (Leo) Ritzmann, later known as Some & Any.

The only judge on the show to be at least on every season is Detlef Soost, who got to fame through this show and is famous for being very strict and hard to the contestants but outside of training and judging he treats them very respectfully. He is Germany's most famous choreographer.

There are some connections to its sister show Germany's Next Topmodel as the winning bands from the show performed on the live finale of Heidi Klum's model show during the models running the catwalk.

Season synopses

Season 1 (2000): Popstars – Du bist mein Traum

Season 2 (2001): Popstars – Du bist mein Traum

Season 3 (2003): Popstars – Das Duell

Season 4 (2004): Popstars – Jetzt oder nie!

Season 5 (2006): Popstars – Neue Engel braucht das Land

Season 6 (2007): Popstars on Stage

Season 7 (2008): Popstars – Just 4 Girls 

Popstars: Just 4 Girls is the seventh season of Popstars, in which young aspiring female singers/dancers compete in order to claim their spots to become Germany's next girl group. The grand prize is a record deal with Warner Music as well as the opportunity to join the Pussycat Dolls on their next World Tour but there are only four spots. The finale was held on 18 December, concluding with the announcement of the fourth band member of the group Queensberry.

Season 8 (2009): Popstars – Du & Ich 

Popstars: Du & Ich (You and I) is the eighth season of Popstars, in which they are looking for a duo. The final combination which genders the band will consist of was open until the finals.
The candidates can apply alone or together, but if they apply together it's unsure if both will survive the elimination. The judge panel changed. Michelle Leonard and Alex Christensen, who was already a member of the jury, joined the judge panel.
The Final on 10 December was won by then 18-year old Vanessa Meisinger and the Brazilian 20-year old Leonardo (Leo) Ritzmann. They are the new Popstars-Duo Some & Any.

Season 9 (2010) : Popstars: Girls Forever 

Popstars: Girls forever was the ninth season of Popstars (Germany), in which young aspiring female singers/dancers compete in order to claim their spots to make it into the next girl group. The new Popstars band LaViVe consist of Katrin, Julia, Meike and Sarah.

Season 10 (2012): Popstars: Der Weg ist das Ziel 

After a one-year break, Popstars returned to Germany. Popstars: Der Weg ist das Ziel (The way is the goal) was be the tenth season of Popstars (Germany). Boys and girls were both allowed to participate in the competition. This season focused on the experience rather on finding a long-successful band, that failed in the past seasons. The season's finalists formed the group Melouria.

Season 11 (2015): Popstars 2015 

The eleventh and final season of Popstars premiered in 2015, all while season the original format which was only opened to female contestants. The finale aired in fall 2015 with the rise of Leandah.

Ratings

Music releases by Popstars winners

Albums

Cheyenne Records

Cheyenne Records was a German record label, founded in 2000 by Holger Roost-Macias. As part of the Cheyenne Media Group which produced the first nine seasons of the German adaptation of the international Popstars franchise, it served as the label for most Popstars winners from 2000 to 2010. In 2014, the label merged with Roost-Macias' second production company Tresor Entertainment GmbH. In late 2020, Bertelsmann Music Group acquired the catalog from Cheyenne Records, including more than 600 master recordings from bands and solo artists who emerged from the Popstars series

References

External links 
 

 
Popstars
2000 German television series debuts
2015 German television series endings
German music television series
German reality television series
German-language television shows
Non-New Zealand television series based on New Zealand television series
ProSieben original programming
RTL Zwei original programming